Yonger Pauli Bastida Pomares (born August-September, 1999) is a Cuban freestyle and folkstyle wrestler who competes at 197 pounds for the Iowa State Cyclones. In freestyle, he is most notably a U23 World bronze medalist and a Junior World silver medalist. Bastida landed at the Iowa State University in 2020, despite no folkstyle experience, and became an All-American at the 2022 NCAA Division I National Championships.

Freestyle career

Cuba 
Born in Trinidad, Cuba, Bastida became one of the most promising prospects in his native country in 2019, when he broke into the international scene. He competed at the senior level 2019 Cerro Pelado International where he took runner-up honors to three-time World Championship medalist Reineris Salas, after previously defeating US Open and NCAA National champion Kyven Gadson. Next, he dropped down to 92 kilograms and claimed a Junior Pan American title in June before once again bumping up a weight class to compete at the Junior World Championships of September, where he claimed a silver medal. A recently-turned 20 year old, Bastida once again dropped down to 92 kilos, competing at the 2019 U23 World Championship, where he compiled a fall and two technical falls to reach the semifinals, falling to Russia's Batyrbek Tsakulov and claiming the bronze medal afterwards to close the year. At the 2020 Cerro Pelado International, Bastida competed for the last time as a Cuban resident, scoring a notable victory over US University National champion Hayden Zillmer before falling to two-time World Champion and Olympic bronze medalist J'den Cox. Bastida was considered to be amongst the contenders for a 2020 Olympic spot before moving to the United States.

Folkstyle career 
In November 2020, it was announced that Bastida had been recruited by Iowa State University as an international student.

2020-2021 
Bastida earned the varsity spot at first when he defeated two-time Iowa (IHSAA) state champion Cody Fisher, via major decision (9–1). As a freshman at 197 pounds, he started off with an undefeated 3–0, but went on to compile an overall 4–4 record in his first folkstyle matches ever. After starting in regular season, Bastida was not chosen for the post-season and Marcus Coleman was started instead.

2021–2022 
Bastida made huge improvements for his sophomore season, and got his first major win over third-ranked Jacob Warner from Iowa while ranked the twenty-fourth in the country himself. His next big upset came in the last dual of the season against Missouri, where he beat sixth-ranked Rocky Elam. Going into the post-season with a 17–3 record, Bastida placed fifth at the Big 12 Championships. At the NCAA National Championships, he started off beating reigning Junior World Champion Braxton Amos from Wisconsin, before being knocked off by Elam. In the consolation bracket, Bastida got four wins, including rival Jake Woodley from Oklahoma and Greg Bulsak from Rutgers, before being beat by Stephan Buchanan from Wyoming. Bastida pinned his opponent in the fifth-place match, finishing the season as an All-American.

Freestyle record 

! colspan="7"| Senior & U23 Freestyle Matches
|-
!  Res.
!  Record
!  Opponent
!  Score
!  Date
!  Event
!  Location
|-
! style=background:white colspan=7 |
|-
|Loss
|7–3
|align=left| J'den Cox
|style="font-size:88%"|TF 1–11
|style="font-size:88%" rowspan=3|February 14, 2020
|style="font-size:88%" rowspan=3|2020 Granma y Cerro Pelado
|style="text-align:left;font-size:88%;" rowspan=3|
 Havana, Cuba
|-
|Win
|7–2
|align=left| Hayden Zillmer
|style="font-size:88%"|7–4
|-
|Win
|6–2
|align=left| Luis Sosa
|style="font-size:88%"|TF 11–0
|-
! style=background:white colspan=7 |
|-
|Win
|5–2
|align=left| Demur Megeneishvili
|style="font-size:88%"|6–2
|style="font-size:88%" rowspan=5|October 28 - November 3, 2019
|style="font-size:88%" rowspan=5|2019 World U23 Wrestling Championship
|style="text-align:left;font-size:88%;" rowspan=5|
 Budapest, Hungary
|-
|Loss
|4–2
|align=left| Batyrbek Tsakulov
|style="font-size:88%"|1–6
|-
|Win
|4–1
|align=left| Bendegúz Tóth
|style="font-size:88%"|TF 13–2
|-
|Win
|3–1
|align=left| Sargis Hovsepyan
|style="font-size:88%"|TF 11–0
|-
|Win
|2–1
|align=left| Michał Bielawski
|style="font-size:88%"|Fall
|-
! style=background:white colspan=7 |
|-
|Loss
|1–1
|align=left| Reineris Salas
|style="font-size:88%"|TF 0–10
|style="font-size:88%" rowspan=2|February 15–23, 2019
|style="font-size:88%" rowspan=2|2019 Granma y Cerro Pelado 
|style="text-align:left;font-size:88%;" rowspan=2|
 Havana, Cuba
|-
|Win
|1–0
|align=left| Kyven Gadson
|style="font-size:88%"|
|-

NCAA record

! colspan="8"| NCAA Division I Record
|-
!  Res.
!  Record
!  Opponent
!  Score
!  Date
!  Event
|-
! style=background:lighgrey colspan=6 |Start of 2022-2023 Season (junior year)
|-
! style=background:lighgrey colspan=6 |End of 2021-2022 Season (sophomore year)
|-
! style=background:white colspan=6 | 2022 NCAA Championships 5th at 197 lbs
|-
|Win
|29–11
|align=left|Gavin Hoffman
|style="font-size:88%"|Fall
|style="font-size:88%" rowspan=8|March 17–19, 2022
|style="font-size:88%" rowspan=8|2022 NCAA Division I National Championships
|-
|Loss
|28–11
|align=left|Stephan Buchanan
|style="font-size:88%"|3–4
|-
|Win
|28–10
|align=left|Greg Bulsak
|style="font-size:88%"|4–3
|-
|Win
|27–10
|align=left|Jake Woodley
|style="font-size:88%"|5–4
|-
|Win
|26–10
|align=left|Kordell Norfleet
|style="font-size:88%"|4–2
|-
|Win
|25–10
|align=left|Jaron Smith
|style="font-size:88%"|11–4
|-
|Loss
|24–10
|align=left|Rocky Elam
|style="font-size:88%"|0–1
|-
|Win
|24–9
|align=left|Braxton Amos
|style="font-size:88%"|3–2
|-
! style=background:white colspan=6 | 2022 Big 12 Conference 5th at 197 lbs
|-
|Win
|23–9
|align=left|Owen Pentz
|style="font-size:88%"|MFOR
|style="font-size:88%" rowspan=4|March 5–6, 2022
|style="font-size:88%" rowspan=4|2022 Big 12 Conference Championships
|-
|Loss
|22–9
|align=left|Jake Woodley
|style="font-size:88%"|0–1
|-
|Loss
|22–8
|align=left|Stephen Buchanan
|style="font-size:88%"|Fall
|-
|Win
|22–7
|align=left|Rocky Elam
|style="font-size:88%"|4–3
|-
|Win
|21–7
|align=left|Rocky Elam
|style="font-size:88%"|SV–1 8–6
|style="font-size:88%"|February 16, 2022
|style="font-size:88%"|Iowa State - Missouri Dual		
|-
|Win
|20–7
|align=left|John Gunderson
|style="font-size:88%"|MD 21–8
|style="font-size:88%"|February 11, 2022
|style="font-size:88%"|Iowa State - Northern Iowa Dual		
|-
|Win
|19–7
|align=left|Kayne Hutchison
|style="font-size:88%"|TF 22–6
|style="font-size:88%"|February 5, 2022
|style="font-size:88%"|Air Force - Iowa State Dual		
|-
|Win
|18–7
|align=left|Jackson Moomau
|style="font-size:88%"|TF 23–8
|style="font-size:88%"|February 4, 2022
|style="font-size:88%"|West Virginia - Iowa State Dual	
|-
|Win
|17–7
|align=left|Gavin Stika
|style="font-size:88%"|MD 18–6
|style="font-size:88%"|January 30, 2022
|style="font-size:88%"|Iowa State - Oklahoma State Dual	
|-
|Loss
|16–7
|align=left|Jake Woodley
|style="font-size:88%"|2–4
|style="font-size:88%"|January 28, 2022
|style="font-size:88%"|Iowa State - Oklahoma Dual	
|-
|Win
|16–6
|align=left|Owen Pentz
|style="font-size:88%"|9–6
|style="font-size:88%"|January 23, 2022
|style="font-size:88%"|North Dakota State - Iowa State Dual	
|-
|Win
|15–6
|align=left|Liam Swanson
|style="font-size:88%"|Fall
|style="font-size:88%" rowspan=2|January 16, 2022
|style="font-size:88%"|Iowa State - Providence (Mont) Dual	
|-
|Win
|14–6
|align=left|Isaac Bartel
|style="font-size:88%"|MD 13–5
|style="font-size:88%"|Iowa State - Montana State-Northern Dual	
|-
|Loss
|13–6
|align=left|Stephen Buchanan
|style="font-size:88%"|SV–1 4–6
|style="font-size:88%"|January 14, 2022
|style="font-size:88%"|Iowa State - Wyoming Dual	
|-
|Win
|13–5
|align=left|Josh Loomer
|style="font-size:88%"|TF 20–5
|style="font-size:88%"|January 12, 2022
|style="font-size:88%"|CSU Bakersfield - Iowa State Dual	
|-
|Win
|12–5
|align=left|Jayshon Hines
|style="font-size:88%"|Fall
|style="font-size:88%"|January 6, 2022
|style="font-size:88%"|Northwest Kansas Technical College - Iowa State Dual	
|-
|Win
|11–5
|align=left|Thomas Penola
|style="font-size:88%"|6–4
|style="font-size:88%"|December 19, 2021
|style="font-size:88%"|Purdue - Iowa State Dual	
|-
|Win
|10–5
|align=left|Jacob Warner
|style="font-size:88%"|4–2
|style="font-size:88%"|December 5, 2021
|style="font-size:88%"|Iowa - Iowa State Dual	
|-
|Win
|9–5
|align=left|Arick Lopez
|style="font-size:88%"|TF 23–8
|style="font-size:88%" rowspan=2|November 27, 2021
|style="font-size:88%"|Cal Baptist - Iowa State Dual	
|-
|Win
|8–5
|align=left|Jack Brown
|style="font-size:88%"|4–3
|style="font-size:88%"|Army - Iowa State Dual	
|-
! style=background:white colspan=6 | 2021 Daktronics Open  at 197 lbs
|-
|Win
|7–5
|align=left|Bennett Tabor
|style="font-size:88%"|TF 18–3
|style="font-size:88%" rowspan=4|November 21, 2021
|style="font-size:88%" rowspan=4|2021 Daktronics Open
|-
|Win
|6–5
|align=left|Spencer Mooberry
|style="font-size:88%"|MD 16–5
|-
|Loss
|5–5
|align=left|Silas Allred
|style="font-size:88%"|Fall
|-
|Win
|5–4
|align=left|Cody Donnelly
|style="font-size:88%"|MD 19–5
|-
! style=background:lighgrey colspan=6 |Start of 2021-2022 Season (sophomore year)
|-
! style=background:lighgrey colspan=6 |End of 2020-2021 Season (freshman year)
|-
|Loss
|4–4
|align=left|Kordell Norfleet
|style="font-size:88%"|MD 7–17
|style="font-size:88%"|February 14, 2021
|style="font-size:88%"|Arizona State - Iowa State Dual
|-
|Loss
|4–3
|align=left|A.J. Ferrari
|style="font-size:88%"|2–5
|style="font-size:88%" rowspan=2|January 30, 2021
|style="font-size:88%"|Oklahoma State - Iowa State Dual
|-
|Win
|4–2
|align=left|Jesus Gutierrez
|style="font-size:88%"|Fall
|style="font-size:88%"|Iowa Central Community College - Iowa State Dual
|-
|Loss
|3–2
|align=left|Jake Woodley
|style="font-size:88%"|MD 0–12
|style="font-size:88%"|January 24, 2021
|style="font-size:88%"|Oklahoma - Iowa State Dual
|-
|Loss
|3–1
|align=left|Rocky Elam
|style="font-size:88%"|4–5
|style="font-size:88%"|January 17, 2021
|style="font-size:88%"|Missouri - Iowa State Dual
|-
|Win
|3–0
|align=left|Joe Reimers
|style="font-size:88%"|Fall
|style="font-size:88%" rowspan=2|January 10, 2021
|style="font-size:88%"|Nebraska-Kearney - Iowa State Dual
|-
|Win
|2–0
|align=left|Brady Vogel
|style="font-size:88%"|MD 18–8
|style="font-size:88%"|Loras - Iowa State Dual
|-
|Win
|1–0
|align=left|Kobe Woods
|style="font-size:88%"|15–8
|style="font-size:88%"|January 3, 2021
|style="font-size:88%"|Wartburg - Iowa State Dual
|-
! style=background:lighgrey colspan=6 |Start of 2020-2021 Season (freshman year)

Stats 

!  Season
!  Year
!  School
!  Rank
!  Weigh Class
!  Record
!  Win
!  Bonus
|-
|2023
|Junior
|rowspan=3|Iowa State University
|#7
|rowspan=3|197
|
|
|
|-
|2022
|Sophomore
|#9 (5th)
|25–7
|78.13%
|40.63%
|-
|2021
|Freshman
|#159
|4–4
|50.00%
|37.50%
|-
|colspan=5 bgcolor="LIGHTGREY"|Career
|bgcolor="LIGHTGREY"|29–11
|bgcolor="LIGHTGREY"|72.50%
|bgcolor="LIGHTGREY"|40.00%

References

External links 
 

Cuban wrestlers
Living people
1999 births
Cuban male sport wrestlers
Iowa State Cyclones wrestlers
Iowa State University alumni
People from Trinidad, Cuba
20th-century Cuban people
21st-century Cuban people